Command & Conquer: Generals is a real-time strategy video game and the seventh installment in the Command & Conquer series. It was released for Microsoft Windows and Mac OS in 2003 and 2004. The Windows version of Generals was developed by EA Pacific and published by EA Games, the Mac OS X version was developed and published by Aspyr Media. The Mac OS X version was re-released by Aspyr for the Mac App Store on March 12, 2005. In the game, the player can choose from three different factions: the United States, China and the Global Liberation Army (GLA).

Generals utilizes SAGE (Strategy Action Game Engine), an extended version of the Command & Conquer: Renegades 3D engine. An expansion pack, entitled Command & Conquer: Generals – Zero Hour, was additionally released for PC in 2003, and for Mac OS in 2005. Both Generals and Zero Hour were met with highly positive reviews. A sequel, Command & Conquer: Generals 2, was in development, until it was repurposed to a free-to-play game known as Command & Conquer. The new game was part of the Generals franchise and was cancelled on October 29, 2013 by EA after negative feedback during the closed alpha test.

Gameplay
Command & Conquer Generals operates in a similar manner to that of other titles in the series - players construct bases and train units from these, acquiring resources on one of the game's maps to fund this, and then defeat their opponents by eliminating their bases and armies. Various units types are available for training, ranging from infantry to ground vehicles and aircraft, each focuses on specific roles (e.g. anti-vehicle), while base structures are divided between unit production, support facilities, and defensive counter-measures. Success in the game relies upon making the most out of mixing units, utilising their advantages while countering their disadvantages with other units, in order to win against opponents - for example, rifle infantry are useful for countering anti-vehicle infantry, but need to rely on tanks to counter anti-infantry vehicles. Units that survive and manage to kill other units gain "veterancy" points, earning chevrons when they level up, effectively improve their abilities and making them more powerful; at the highest level, it also grants the ability to repair any damage when out of combat.

Training can be queued at production structures and units sent to rally points designated by the player, with the ability to research upgrades to improve certain units. In addition, players can also deploy superweapons which can decimate an opponent's forces, though must wait for a cooldown period to end before they can use it again. Factions in the game function similar in how they operate, but maintain differences in units and strategies:

 The United States rely on high-tech weaponry, such as drones, and a dominant air force to deal with opponents, and are able to use supply units to airdrop rifle infantry into occupied buildings, alongside flash grenades, to clear them out. In addition, they can improve power plants, their defensive structures link together to deal with enemy units, and they collect more supplies than the other two factions, but units are more expensive to produce.
 China relies on stronger tank and artillery units, and can use hackers to claim buildings or produce additional funds. In addition, their troop transports can detect stealth units, while their tanks and infantry can occur horde bonuses when grouped together. However, their power plants can cause damage to surrounding units and buildings when destroyed, they maintain a weaker air force, and require large armies to make horde bonuses work effectively.
 The Global Liberation Army rely on cheap units and terrorist-styled guerrilla combat to overcome opponents, in which several vehicle units can be upgraded by salvaging parts from defeated enemy vehicles (infantry can also claim this for funds), using specialised infantry units to create ambushes and considerable damage. In addition, they do not require power for base structures, and any buildings that are destroyed will be automatically rebuilt if the enemy fails to destroy a tunnel entrance that is left behind. However, they must use builder units to collect supplies, with several needed to ensure funds are steady, and cannot build air units; this is compensated by having more anti-air units than the other two factions.

Generals functions differently to other titles in the series, in that base construction relies on dedicated builder units rather than a central construction building, but with the added ability of being able to construct buildings anywhere on the map. Resources are restricted to supply docks that have a limited amount for collection, with each faction able to construct units or buildings that provide continual resources as long as they are not destroyed. In addition, players can also make use of "Generals Abilities" - a unique set of bonuses that can be purchased upon earning experience points during the game, which can confer additional abilities such as support powers (e.g. airstrikes), improvements to certain units, or access to additional units for construction.

Single-player
In a single-player mode, players can tackle one of three campaigns, each dedicated to a faction and consisting of  seven missions. While a training mission is provided to allow new players to become accustomed to the game, players can freely choose which campaign to tackle and at what difficulty, with each mission becoming moderately more difficult and featuring different scenarios to tackle.

Multiplayer
Games can be played both over the Internet or a local area network (LAN). It adopts a similar format to skirmish mode whereby the goal is to eliminate the other team. Games over the Internet can be completely random, in the form of a Quick Match. Players can also play in Custom Matches where the number of players, the map and rules are decided upon by the host.

The online feature originally worked via GameSpy servers. After the shutdown of GameSpy in 2014, these were no longer available.

The macOS version of the game released for the Mac App Store does not support multiplayer. Apple discontinued Game Center for online play with the release of macOS Sierra.

Soundtrack
Generals presents players with a separate musical score for each faction. The United States' theme music consists of grand, militaristic scores composed by Bill Brown and Mikael Sandgren. China's musical themes feature apocalyptic, orchestral scores combined with East Asian instrumentation. The GLA faction's theme soundtrack can be described as a combination of Middle Eastern and few South Asian sounds coupled with heavy metal music.

World Builder
Generals includes a map editor named World Builder for the PC edition only. The World Builder includes features such as:
 A terraforming tool
 An intelligent road system, able to detect when the player wants an intersection
 A tool to scatter flora around the map
 Waypoints and area triggers that the AI can use. Waypoints also determine starting points for the players on a skirmish map
 A scripting system that was meant for the missions in the single-player campaign

Plot

Setting
Generals takes place in the near future, the world's two superpowers - China and the United States as loose allies fight the Global Liberation Army (GLA), itself a terrorist organisation primarily based in the Middle East, North Africa as well as Central Asia. In chronological order, the campaign is played through the Chinese, GLA and then the United States perspectives respectively.

China

A military parade in Beijing is attacked by GLA forces, culminating in the detonation of a stolen Chinese nuclear warhead and the beginning of the GLA's incursion inside China's borders. The Chinese mobilise to stall and contain the GLA, having to destroy the Three Gorges Dam as well as the Hong Kong Convention and Exhibition Center in the process. Now on the offensive, the Chinese launch into GLA strongholds, arriving at the terror cell's main headquarters in Dushanbe. Utilising nuclear weapons, the Chinese put an end to the GLA's offensive.

GLA

Despite losses to China, the GLA maintains its presence across Central Asia and the Middle East. In efforts to revive itself, the GLA raid UN convoys and incite riots in Astana. The United States enters the war, occupying GLA toxin depositories in the Aral Sea and a GLA renegade sides with the Chinese with the intention to destroy the GLA. The GLA retaliate by attacking the Baikonur Cosmodrome, and uses the platform to launch devastating toxin attacks at highly populated cities.

USA

The United States mobilises its forces to the Middle East, Hindu Kush and then Kazakhstan to finally put an end to the GLA. Despite losses incurred from GLA Anthrax attacks and ambushes, the USA are able to push the GLA back to their final stronghold in Akmola Region. With Chinese support, the USA destroys the last GLA stronghold, ending the GLA's reign of tyranny.

Reception

After its release, Generals received mostly positive reviews. Based on 34 reviews, Metacritic gives it a score of 84/100, which includes a score of 9.3/10 from IGN. Generals has received the E3 2002 Game Critics Awards Best Strategy Game award. GameSpot named Generals the best computer game of February 2003.

In the United Kingdom, it sold over 100,000 units during the first half of 2003. This made it the United Kingdom's second-best-selling computer game for the period, or seventh across all platforms. At the time, Kristan Reed of GamesIndustry.biz wrote that its performance proved "you can still have big hits on PC". Generals received a "Silver" sales award from the Entertainment and Leisure Software Publishers Association (ELSPA), indicating sales of at least 100,000 copies in the United Kingdom. The game's Deluxe release received another "Silver" award from ELSPA.

Ban in Germany
Initially, the game was released in Germany under its international title Command & Conquer: Generals. However, the Bundesprüfstelle für jugendgefährdende Medien (Federal Department for Media Harmful to Young People) placed the game onto the "List of Media Harmful to Young People" two months after the initial release, which, by law, forbids further public advertising and any sale for people under 18 years of age. The BPjM stated that the game would give underage people the ability to play the war in the game. Additionally, the player would be able to kill civilians. Based on these two points the BPjM put the game on the Index, because they believed it glorified war.
Therefore, sale to minors and marketing the original version of the game were prohibited throughout the Federal Republic of Germany.

Due to the ban, EA released in the middle of 2003 a regular title-localized German version specifically for the German market called Command & Conquer: Generäle, which did not incorporate real world factions or any relation to terrorism. For example, the "terrorist" bomber unit was transformed into a rolling bomb and all other infantry units were changed into "cyborgs" (e.g. Red Guard becomes Standard Cyborg) in order of appearance and unit responses similar to earlier releases of the Command & Conquer franchise.

Sequel
In September 2003, an expansion pack called Generals – Zero Hour was released, which continues the story of Generals. In December 2011, a sequel, Command & Conquer: Generals 2, was announced, due to be released in 2013. Generals 2 was repurposed to a free-to-play game known as simply Command & Conquer. The new game would have started with the Generals franchise and may have expanded to the rest of the franchise post-release. The game's project was cancelled on October 29, 2013. Later in November, EA said that the game will still be developed by a new game studio, but no further news emerged and the project appears to be abandoned.

References

2003 video games
Alternate history video games
Aspyr games
Generals
Interactive Achievement Award winners
MacOS games
Multiplayer and single-player video games
Real-time strategy video games
SAGE (game engine) games
Terrorism in fiction
Video games developed in the United States
Video games scored by Bill Brown
Video games set in China
Video games set in Hong Kong
Video games set in Iraq
Video games set in Kazakhstan
Video games set in Kyrgyzstan
Video games set in Tajikistan
Video games set in Turkey
Video games set in Yemen
Video games with expansion packs
Works banned in China
Windows games
D.I.C.E. Award for Strategy/Simulation Game of the Year winners